Natalie Kampen (February 1, 1944 – August 12, 2012) was an American art historian and women's studies professor.

She was born Natalie Boymel on February 1, 1944 in Philadelphia to Pauline (née Friedman) and Jules Boymel. She received her bachelor's and master's degrees from the University of Pennsylvania in 1965 and 1967, respectively. She went on to attend Brown University, receiving her PhD in 1976. Her thesis analyzed depictions of Roman working women in second and third century reliefs from Ostia Antica. Boymel taught at the University of Rhode Island from 1969 to 1988. She taught women's studies and art history at Barnard College.

Kampen was a patron of Hera Gallery, a feminist artist cooperative in Wakefield, Rhode Island.

She was honored as Woman of the Year by the Association for Professional and Academic Women in 1988.

She died in Wakefield, Rhode Island.

Selected works

References

1944 births
2012 deaths
American art historians
Barnard College faculty
Brown University alumni
Writers from Philadelphia
University of Pennsylvania alumni
University of Rhode Island faculty
Women's studies academics
Women art historians
Educators from Philadelphia
American women educators
Historians from Pennsylvania
American women historians
21st-century American women